Rayden Tallis (born 9 June 1975) is a former Australian rules footballer who played with Hawthorn in the AFL.

Tallis made his Hawthorn debut in 1994 and earned a Rising Star nomination late in the season. He usually played in the back pocket but was also used through the midfield. Former Hawthorn star Dermott Brereton earned a lengthy suspension for standing on Rayden Tallis' head during a pre-season game in 1994.

External links

1975 births
Living people
Australian rules footballers from Victoria (Australia)
Hawthorn Football Club players
Eastern Ranges players